were a Japanese rock band active from 1997 to 2010. During all promotional appearances, their faces are masked by drawings resembling themselves as printed by a dot-matrix printer.

History
Beat Crusaders, commonly abbreviated BECR, was founded at the end of 1997 by Tōru Hidaka, as an experimental U.S. Lo-Fi Indie Rock unit. The rest of the band later joined as a result of continual experimental gigs performed around the Shimokitazawa area of Tokyo. Their creative use of analog synthesizers and an old Casiotone, incorporated with influences of such bands as Weezer and The Rentals, and at times the dynamism of Snuffesque rock, had transformed them into a powerfully melodic guitar band. By the end of 1998, Beat Crusaders had become known for a crazy and fun live act that was not to be missed. The momentum continued with a single, "E.C.D.T." released in June of the following year which entered independent charts of CD retail shops all across Japan. A month later their first mini-album, Howling Symphony of... was released; this entered the charts again with various music magazines giving a big thumbs up. Reflecting their chart action and praise from magazines, numerous gigs followed with notable bands in the Japanese alternative/independent scene, from guitar pop and new wave, to pop punk and ska bands. They continued to be busy, with their second single "Firestarter" released in early 2000, and  the full-length album, "All You Can Eat". They also were involved in four compilations, including an shared EP entitled WXY, with songs from Japanese punk band Captain Hedgehog.

In August 2003, three of the four original members of Beat Crusaders left the band, to eventually go on to form the band Anita Chili Peppers. This left behind only Tōru Hidaka who later recruited four new members.  It is not known why the original members left, but it doesn't seem like they left on bad terms, considering Hidaka included the masks of his former bandmates and his actions (he was crying) in the PV, "Sensation".

Later on, their song "Hit in the USA" was used for the opening of the BECK: Mongolian Chop Squad anime, which moved the band into the Japanese mainstream. Since then they released several more albums, including a cover album of American and British songs entitled "Music Crusaders." Their song "Tonight, Tonight, Tonight" was used as the fourth opening of the Bleach anime. In 2006, the band's music made its first American appearance as the opening theme song, "Hey x 2 Look x 2" (AKA "Hey Hey Look Look") to the Nicktoons animated series Kappa Mikey. The single "Winterlong" was also used as the opening of the Hero Tales anime.

A full-length CD EPopMaking, was released on May 30, 2007, with 19 tracks, followed by Popdod on June 4, 2008.

In 2010, Toru Hidaka confirmed that Beat Crusaders would break-up, but promised to release one more album. Titled Rest Crusaders, it was released on October 6, 2010, with 22 tracks of both new songs, old singles like "Windom", and previously released but recent singles like "Let It Go" and "Situation".

Members
  - vocals, guitar
  - bass
  - guitar
  - drums
  - keyboard

Former members
umu (real name ) - bass, vocals
araki (real name ) - drums, vocals
thai (real name ) - keyboard, guitar, vocals RIP 2011

Discography

Studio albums

Singles

EP/Misc

Compilations

Split albums

References

External links
 Official site
 

Defstar Records artists
Japanese alternative rock groups
Japanese power pop groups
Japanese pop punk groups
Masked musicians
Musical groups from Tokyo
Musical groups established in 1997
Musical groups disestablished in 2010